Marriage of Inconvenience (Traditional Chinese: 兩妻時代) is a TVB modern drama series broadcast in November 2007, starring Bobby Au Yeung, Angela Tong and Toby Leungas the main leads.

Synopsis
The owner of a marriage bureau, the candid Kong Hoi-chuen (Bobby Au Yeung), has no luck in finding a girlfriend. He meets Miu Ling (Angela Tong), who has just been disappointed in love, by chance. With his words of consolation, Ling is able to recover. Six months later, Ling agrees to marry Chuen. The marriage lasts happily for three years, husband and wife end up working in the marriage bureau in a home they adore. Just when Chuen thinks that he is the happiest husband in the world, Ling's ex-lover Ivan (Raymond Wong) returns. Several years ago Ivan left Ling because he didn't want to be 'tied down' in a relationship, but now he wants a second chance. When he meets with Ling again he kisses her, despite her resistance, and Chuen misinterprets the situation. Chuen is angry and furious, getting himself helplessly drunk in his office, and when he wakes he finds himself beside one of his clients, mainlander Ng Yi Wu-Jiu (Toby Leung). Ling sees this and, like her husband, misinterprets the situation and demands a divorce.

The divorce proceeds almost smoothly, as Cheun and Ling want out as soon as possible. Unfortunately it is not as simple as they thought. Ling, believing that she has been wronged, refuses to move out of her beloved house. Cheun, who sees the house as his, decides to arrange a fake marriage with Ng Yi Wu-Jiu. In exchange for staying at the house for free, she pretends to be his lover. The plan was that they would anger Ling enough to leave. While Cheun works on angering Ling in the house, she retaliates by hiring Ivan to work in the bureau and patroning his restaurant, which angers Cheun.

Later they learn that Ng Yi Wu-Jiu is the girl of a Triad leader. She has loyal followers and rival gangs trying to kill her. Ivan meanwhile has shown himself to be quite capable and no longer a worthless playboy, with good connections and plenty of wealth. As Chuen and Ling learn, their fighting might have involved too many unknown elements.

Cast

Viewership ratings

Awards and nominations
41st TVB Anniversary Awards (2008)
 "Best Drama"

References

External links
TVB.com Marriage of Inconvenience - Official Website 

TVB dramas
2007 Hong Kong television series debuts
2007 Hong Kong television series endings